The men's 100 yards at the 1962 British Empire and Commonwealth Games as part of the athletics programme was held at the Perry Lakes Stadium on Friday 23 November and Saturday 24 November 1962.

The top four runners in each of the initial nine heats qualified for the second round. Those 36 runners competed in six heats in the second round, with the top two runners from each heat qualifying for the semifinals. There were two semifinals, and only the top three from each heat advanced to the final.

The event was won by Kenyan Seraphino Antao in 9.5 seconds, with the world record holder and favourite Canadian Harry Jerome finishing last, severely injured, in the final.

Records

Round 1

Heat 1

Heat 2

Heat 3

Heat 4

Heat 5

Heat 6

Heat 7

Heat 8

Heat 9

Round 2

Heat 1

Heat 2

Heat 3

Heat 4

Heat 5

Heat 6

Semifinals

Semifinal 1

Semifinal 2

Final
Wind -1.8 m/s

References

Men's 100 yards
1962